Buffy the Vampire Slayer (BFI TV Classics S.) is a 2005 academic publication relating to the fictional Buffyverse established by TV series, Buffy and Angel.

Anne Billson's book gives an extended overview of the history of Buffy. She details the show's antecedents and influences and explores how, in a broadcasting environment necessary for a long-running series, the show was able to push the envelope and grow into a fully realized mythology in which the supernatural is made real through emotional honesty.

Contents

"Before Buffy"
"The Chosen One"
"Welcome to the Hellmouth"
"Love and Other Catastrophes"
"The Dark Side"
"Higher Learning"
"Death and the Maiden"
"Revenge of the Nerds"
"Sharing the Power"
"After Buffy"

Books about the Buffyverse
British Film Institute
2005 non-fiction books
British books